Amy Julia Drucker (1873 – November 1951) was a British artist and educator of Jewish descent.

Biography
The daughter of a wine merchant and his wife from Germany, Drucker was born in London and grew up in Hampstead. She was educated at South Hampstead High School and studied art at St John's Wood Art School and the Lambeth School of Art, both in London, and at the Académie Colarossi in Paris. She had a studio in Bloomsbury. Besides paintings, watercolours and pastels, she also produced lithographs, miniatures, woodcut prints, drawings and etchings. She exhibited her work regularly from 1888 to 1949 at various venues in England, including at the Royal Academy in London. She also exhibited at the Paris Salon and had solo shows in Buenos Aires, Lima, Panama, Jerusalem, Beijing and Shanghai.

Drucker travelled  extensively, spending time in the Europe, the Far East, South America, Palestine and Abyssinia, where was commissioned to paint a portrait of Haile Selassie. She made extensive drawings of the people and cultures she encountered on her travels and taught painting and printing in Calcutta, at the Jerusalem School of Art and gave private art lessions in London.

During World War I, Drucker served in the Women's Land Army. During World War II, she worked in a factory and as a night watchman. After her death, two portfolios of her work were presented at the Royal Anthropological Institute. In 1952, an exhibit of her work was shown at the Ben Uri Gallery and a prize was awarded in two consecutive years in her name to a promising young Jewish artist. The Ben Uri Gallery holds several works by Drucker.

Some of her better-known paintings include:
 The Aliens
 Wentworth Street at Night
 Arab Water Carriers 
 For He had Great Possessions

References

External links

1873 births
1951 deaths
20th-century English painters
20th-century English women artists
Académie Colarossi alumni
Alumni of St John's Wood Art School
Alumni of the Lambeth School of Art
English people of German-Jewish descent
English women painters
Jewish women artists
Painters from London
People from Hampstead
Women's Land Army members (World War I)